Mexico competed at the 2012 Summer Paralympics in London, United Kingdom, from 29 August to 9 September 2012.

Medallists
The following Mexican competitors won medals at the Games.

Archery

Mexico qualified one athlete in Archery.

Men

|-
|align=left|Jose Baez
|align=left|Individual recurve W1/W2
|555
|21
| (12) L 0–6
|colspan=5|Did not advance
|}

Athletics

Men–track

Men–field

Women–track

Women–field

Boccia

Individual

Equestrian

The only equestrian events held in the Paralympic Games are in the Dressage discipline. Mexico sent a team of three riders to the Games.

Individual

Team

Judo

Three Mexican judokas qualified for the Games.

Men

Women

Powerlifting

Swimming

Men

Women

Table tennis

Women

Wheelchair basketball

Women's tournament

Group play

Quarter-final

5th–8th place semi-final

7th/8th place match

References

External links
Medal Count at London 2012 Olympics and Paralympics Summer Games Official Website.

Nations at the 2012 Summer Paralympics
2012
Paralympics